The 6th Gran Premio di Napoli was a Formula Two motor race held on 10 May 1953 at Posillipo, Naples. The race was run over 60 laps of the circuit, and was won by Italian driver Giuseppe Farina in a Ferrari 500, starting from pole. Maserati teammates Juan Manuel Fangio and José Froilán González were second and third, both driving a Maserati A6GCM. Alberto Ascari set fastest lap in a Ferrari 500 but finished in fifth place, five laps down.

Results

References

Naples Grand Prix
Grand Prix of Naples
Naples
Naples